Mimudea poliosticta is a moth in the family Crambidae. It was described by George Hampson in 1903. It is found in Sri Lanka.

References

Moths described in 1903
Spilomelinae